Edoardo Navone (Rome, 1844–1912) was an Italian painter of rural scenes, in a Realist style.

Biography
He was a resident of Rome, where he studied at the Academy of Fine Arts. He worked principally in watercolor, and painted laborers and animals in the Roman countryside. Among his works: Buttero; Costumi del Lazio; Ciociara. At the 1883 Mostra Nazionale of Rome and the 1884 Mostra at Turin, he exhibited: Al passeggio and La zingara.

References

19th-century Italian painters
Italian male painters
20th-century Italian painters
1844 births
1912 deaths
19th-century Italian male artists
20th-century Italian male artists